Bourg-la-Reine is a commune in the southern suburbs of Paris, France.

History 
In 1792, during the French Revolution, Bourg-la-Reine (meaning "Town of the Queen") was renamed Bourg-l'Égalité (meaning "Equality borough"). The name Bourg-la-Reine was restored in 1812.

Population
The inhabitants are called Réginaburgiens.

Transport 
Bourg-la-Reine is served by Bourg-la-Reine station on Paris RER line B.

Education 
Public schools in the commune include:
Preschools: École de la Fontaine-Grelot, École Etienne-Thieulin-la-Faïencerie, École des Bas-Coquarts
Elementary schools: École République, École Etienne-Thieulin-la-Faïencerie, École Pierre-Loti
Collège Évariste Galois

Nearby public senior high schools:
 In Cachan: Lycée Maximilien Sorre
 In Châtenay-Malabry: Lycée Jean-Jaurès
 In Sceaux: Lycée Lakanal, Lycée Marie Curie, Lycée d’enseignement professionnel Florian

Private schools in the commune:
 Institut Notre Dame – preschool through senior high school

There are nearby institutes of higher education in Paris, Châtenay-Malabry, and Sceaux.

Twinning 
The town is twinned with:
 Kenilworth, UK (since 1982)
 Yanqing, China (1998)
 Reghin, Romania (1999)
 Monheim am Rhein, Germany (2000)

Personalities 
Bourg-la-Reine was the birthplace of:
 Évariste Galois (1811–1832), mathematician
 Henri Couillaud (1878–1955), French classical trombonist
 Louis Joxe (1901–1991), statesman 
 Modibo Diakité, footballer 
 Yannick N'Gog rugby player 
 Claire Nebout, actress
 Melvin Raffin, athlete

Marquis de Condorcet (1743–1794) died in the city's prison during the French Revolution, and is buried in the city's cemetery.

Pierre-Adrien Dalpayrat (1844–1910), ceramicist, spent the last twenty years of his life there. His home is now a museum exhibiting 120 original works.

Gallery

See also 
 Communes of the Hauts-de-Seine department

References

External links 

 

Communes of Hauts-de-Seine